Thomas Northcote (30 November 1893 – November 1991) was a British sports shooter. He competed in the 600 m free rifle event at the 1924 Summer Olympics.

References

External links
 

1893 births
1991 deaths
British male sport shooters
Olympic shooters of Great Britain
Shooters at the 1924 Summer Olympics
People from Salford
20th-century British people